Michael James Leahy OBE (born 7 January 1949) was the General Secretary of the British Trade Union Community. Leahy was General Secretary of the Iron and Steel Trades Confederation (ISTC) from 1999 until it merged with the National Union of Knitwear, Footwear & Apparel Trades (KFAT) in 2004 to form Community.  He served as General Secretary until 2013.

Early life
Leahy was born in Pontypool, Wales, in 1949. He attended Twmpath Secondary Modern School. Michael joined the ISTC in 1965 upon starting work as a Chargehand at Panteg Steel Works, where he was employed from 1965 to 1977.

He is married with two children.

Union career
Leahy was employed as an organiser from 1977 to 1986, then as a senior organiser from 1986 to 1992. He was elected Assistant General Secretary of ISTC in 1993 and General Secretary in 1999.

Leahy was President of the iron, steel and nonferrous metals sector of the International Metalworkers' Federation (IMF) and sat on the executive of European Metalworkers' Federation (EMF-FEM). He was a member of the Trades Union Congress (TUC) executive committee, and was the President of the TUC for 2011.

Middle East Peace Process 
Leahy is a co-founder of the Trade Unions Linking Israel and Palestine.

References

Living people
General Secretaries of the Iron and Steel Trades Confederation
British trade union leaders
People from Pontypool
1949 births
Members of the General Council of the Trades Union Congress
Presidents of the General Federation of Trade Unions (UK)
Presidents of the Trades Union Congress
Officers of the Order of the British Empire